Ategumia actealis is a moth in the family Crambidae. It was described by Francis Walker in 1859. It is found in Brazil and Honduras.

References

Moths described in 1859
Spilomelinae
Moths of Central America
Moths of South America